Kenneth George Ellacott (born March 3, 1959) is a Canadian former professional ice hockey goaltender. Ellacott played in the National Hockey League for the Vancouver Canucks in 1982–83. He played 12 games in the NHL, spending most of his professional career in the minor professional Central Hockey League with the Dallas Black Hawks and Montana Magic. Ellacott also played briefly for the Fredericton Express of the American Hockey League. His junior career was spent with the Peterborough Petes of the Ontario Hockey League.

Career statistics

Regular season and playoffs

External links

1959 births
Living people
Dallas Black Hawks players
Fredericton Express players
Montana Magic players
Ice hockey people from Ontario
Peterborough Petes (ice hockey) players
Sportspeople from the County of Brant
Vancouver Canucks draft picks
Vancouver Canucks players
Canadian ice hockey goaltenders